Typhlosyrinx panamica is a species of sea snail, a marine gastropod mollusk in the family Raphitomidae.

Description
The length of the shell attains 29.1 mm.

Distribution
This marine species occurs in the Gulf of Panama

References

 Bouchet, P. & Sysoev, A., 2001. Typhlosyrinx-like tropical deep-water turriform gastropods (Mollusca, Gastropoda, Conoidea). Journal of Natural History 35: 1693-1715

External links
 

panamica
Gastropods described in 2001